Hyblaeidae are the "teak moths", a family of insects in the Lepidopteran order. The two genera with about 18 species make up one of the two families of the Hyblaeoidea superfamily (the other family being the monotypic Prodidactidae), which in the past has been included in the Pyraloidea. 
Recent phylogenetic studies find varying relationships of Hyblaeoidea among Ditrysian Lepidoptera: Mutanen et al. (2010) find the superfamily to group either with Pyraloidea, or – more often – with Thyridoidea or butterflies. The results of Wahlberg et al. (2013) and Heikilä et al. (2015) indicate a sister-group relationship with Pyraloidea.

Males have a specialised "hair-pencil" on the hindleg.

The genus Hyblaea is distributed throughout the Old World tropics, and Torone in the Neotropics. Caterpillar host plants are well known and comprise almost exclusively species of the families Bignoniaceae, Verbenaceae, the mangrove families Avicenniaceae and Rhizophoraceae and a few other families.

References

Sources
Firefly Encyclopedia of Insects and Spiders, edited by Christopher O'Toole, 2002

External links

Tree of Life
Hyblaeidae of Australia
Natural History Museum hosts database
Hyblaea constellata Accessed 4 Mar 2007
Caterpillar of Hyblaea puera Cramer Accessed 4 Mar 2007 
CSIRO Slideshow of Hyblaeidae

 
Moth families
Obtectomera